Toʻrtkoʻl (also spelled as Turtkul, is a city in Karakalpakstan, Uzbekistan and the administrative center of the Toʻrtkoʻl District. Its population is 58,200 (2016).

History
The city was founded as a Russian garrison after the Khivan campaign of 1873 and before 1920 was known as Petroaleksandrovsk. It was then a major jewelry producing center of Uzbekistan, and was equipped with telegraph in 1913 and with a radio station in 1922; the station began regular translations in 1930. 

In 1932, the city was renamed to Turtkul (from Turkish törtkül meaning square) and between 1932 and 1939 was the capital of the newly formed autonomous republic of Karakalpakstan. The city was standing nearby a major Amu Darya River, which is known for significantly altering its flow path several times in its history. In 1932, Amu Darya once more changed its terrain and flooded Turtkul. This and past damage by Amu Darya urged the authorities to move the capital of Karakalpakstal over 170 km to Nukus in 1939. The river banks were reinforced, stopping further flooding. However, in 1942 the river suddenly moved on Turtkul destroying it overnight. Consequently, in 1949 Turtkul had been relocated.

Climate
Toʻrtkoʻl has a cold desert climate (Köppen climate classification BWk). The climate is continental, arid and hot. Annual precipitation is 97 mm; it is the highest in March at about 20 mm and is nearly zero between July and September. The evaporation exceeds precipitation on average by 36 times and sometimes up to 270 times.

Economy
The city has a cotton processing factory, a reinforced concrete plant, an asphalt plant and an external section of Nukus Medical School.

Notable person
Tuti Yusupova, longevity claimant, died in 2015, possibly 134 years old.

References

Populated places in Karakalpakstan
Cities in Uzbekistan
Syr-Darya Oblast